Ferrari has manufactured three naturally-aspirated V8 racing engines, designed for Formula One racing.

Tipo DS50

The Tipo DS50 engine, used in the Ferrari D50, was introduced in 1954.

Tipo 205/B

Tipo 056
Ferrari Type 056 was introduced by Ferrari, who used it in Formula 1 between 2006 and 2013. The V8 engine was developed under engine chief Paolo Martinelli. Its predecessor is the Tipo 055 used in the 2005 season, successor type 059/3 from 2014.

Development
After the FIA had decided to introduce V8 engines from the 2006 season, Ferrari began developing such an engine for use in a Formula 1 car in mid-2004. In August 2005 the first test drives took place. For this purpose, the Tipo 056 was installed in a modified F2004. The road car engine department helped develop the Tipo 056. The engine management was by Magneti Marelli.

Usage
Ferrari used the engine from 2006 to 2013. In the 2009 and 2011 to 2013 seasons, Ferrari used the Tipo 056 in conjunction with KERS.

Red Bull also used the engine in 2006, but sourced its engines from Renault from the next season.

Scuderia Toro Rosso drove the Type 056 from 2007 to 2013, with KERS in the 2011 and 2013 seasons.

Spyker built the Type 056 in 2007, its successor Force India in 2008. For the 2009 season, Force India switched to Mercedes as the engine supplier.

From the 2010 to 2013 season, Sauber also obtained its engines from Ferrari. Sauber used KERS from the 2011 season.

On the very first race weekend in Bahrain in 2006, Michael Schumacher secured pole position in the Ferrari 248 F1 with the Tipo 056. The first victory followed three races later at the San Marino Grand Prix, also by Schumacher. Fernando Alonso 's last victory with the Tipo 056 came at the 2013 Spanish Grand Prix. The most victories per season were nine, which was achieved three times with the Type 056 – in 2006, 2007, and 2008.

The Tipo 056 claimed 39 victories in 147 races (including 38 by Ferrari and one by Toro Rosso). Its drivers took 29 pole positions and set the fastest laps in 48 races. A driver with Tipo 056 stood on the podium 122 times. With him, Ferrari won a drivers' and two constructors' world championships.

Specifications
Weight: 95 kg
Configuration: 90° V8
Valves:	4 per cylinder
Bore: 98mm
Stroke: 38.9mm
Displacement: 2.4 liters
No. of revolutions:	Max. 19,000 rpm
Exhaust: Two outlet pipes
Power output: ~ 577 kW (785 hp)
Torque output: ~ 325 N.m. (240 lb-ft)

Types
Tipo DS50 (1955-1957):  -  @ 8,100 rpm
Tipo 205/B (1964-1965):  -  @ 11,000 rpm
Tipo 056 (2006-2013):  -  @ 18,000-19,000 rpm

Applications
Ferrari D50
Ferrari 158
Ferrari 248 F1
Ferrari F2007
Ferrari F2008
Ferrari F60
Ferrari F10
Ferrari 150º Italia
Ferrari F2012
Ferrari F138
Red Bull RB2
Toro Rosso STR2
Toro Rosso STR3
Toro Rosso STR4
Toro Rosso STR5
Toro Rosso STR6
Toro Rosso STR6
Toro Rosso STR7
Toro Rosso STR8
Spyker F8-VII / Force India VJM01
Sauber C29
Sauber C30
Sauber C31
Sauber C32

Formula One World Championship results
3 World Constructors' Championships
3 World Drivers' Championships
47 race wins
51 fastest laps
143 podium finishes

References

Engines by model
Ferrari engines
Formula One engines
Gasoline engines by model
V8 engines
Lancia engines